N 180B is an emission nebula located in the Large Magellanic Cloud.

References

Emission nebulae
Dorado (constellation)
Large Magellanic Cloud